Meskheti Range (Meskh/Meskhet/Meskhetian Range, Adzhar-Imereti Range, Achara-Imereti Range Adzhar-Akhaltsikh Range also Moschian Mountains) is a part of the Lesser Caucasus mountain range in Meskheti region, in southwestern Georgia.

Geography 
The length of the range is 150 km and the highest point is Mount Mepistskharo at an elevation of 2,850 m above sea level. The Meskheti Range is characterized by high amounts of precipitation.  The territory around Mt. Mtirala (the Ajarian section of the range) was the wettest region within the Soviet Union and is the most humid area of the Caucasus with an annual precipitation of approximately 4500mm/year (180 inches/year). Several rivers are flowing from the Meskheti Range — Supsa, Acharis-Tsqali and Natanebi.

Flora and fauna 
The slopes of the Meskheti Range are rich in endemic and relic species and mainly covered by deciduous forests (oak, chestnut, maple, hornbeam, beech) below 1,200 m above sea level and by coniferous  forests (spruce, fir and in some cases pine) from 1,200 to 1,800 m. The highest regions of the range are covered by sub-alpine and alpine meadows.

Strabo mentions the Moschian Mountains as joining the Caucasus. (Geography, 11.2.1)

14%  of  Meskheti  range territory is  included  in  three Georgian national parks — Borjomi-Kharagauli, Kintrishi and Mtirala national parks.

See also 
Likhi Range

References

Mountain ranges of Georgia (country)